Giuseppe Carando (born 18 March 1964) is an Italian rower. He competed at the 1984 Summer Olympics and the 1988 Summer Olympics.

References

1964 births
Living people
Italian male rowers
Olympic rowers of Italy
Rowers at the 1984 Summer Olympics
Rowers at the 1988 Summer Olympics
Sportspeople from Turin